William Charles Mecum (May 4, 1972 – April 29, 2021) was an American musician and lead guitarist for the rock band Karma to Burn (K2B). During K2B's seven-year hiatus from 2002–2009, he played guitar for instrumental bands Treasure Cat and Dragon Ass. He also played drums in the band Admiral prior to forming Karma to Burn. He lived in West Virginia. Mecum died on April 29, 2021, as a result of a traumatic head injury, from an accidental fall. As of the time of his death, he was the last remaining founding member in the lineup of the band.

Discography
Admiral
 Admiral (1990)
 Revolving and Loading (1991)

Karma to Burn
Karma to Burn     (Roadrunner Records, 1997)
Wild, Wonderful Purgatory     (Roadrunner Records, 1999)
Almost Heathen     (Spitfire Records, 2001)
Appalachian Incantation     (Napalm Records, 2010)
V     (Napalm Records, 2011)
Arch Stanton  (FABA/Deepdive Records, 2014)
Mountain Czar (Rodeostar Records, 2016)
Karma to Burn/Sons of Alpha Centauri: The Definitive 7" Trilogy (H42 Records, 2017)

Treasure Cat
 Treasure Cat EP (2006)
 Choice Cuts (2007)

References

External links

1972 births
2021 deaths
20th-century American guitarists
21st-century American guitarists
Accidental deaths in West Virginia
American male guitarists
American rock guitarists
Deaths from head injury
Guitarists from Los Angeles
Karma to Burn members
Year Long Disaster members